The Kanta is a traditional shield of the Toraja and Pamona people of Tana Toraja Regency, South Sulawesi and Poso Regency, Central Sulawesi, Indonesia respectively.

Description
It is a long slender shield, V-shaped over its entire length. It tapers somewhat towards the lower and upper parts. It is richly decorated with goat's hair dyed white, black and red, which are worked on horizontal tufts and inlaid with small shells or white bone. These tufts of white, red and black colored hair are mounted in overlapping rows.

References 

Shields
Military equipment of Indonesia